= 1948 population census in Bosnia and Herzegovina =

Seventh Census of Bosnia and Herzegovina
15 March 1948

General information
- Country: Bosnia and Herzegovina

Results
- Total population: 2,565,277

Population of Bosnia and Herzegovina in 1948 by nationality
1. Serbs (44.3%)
2. Ethnically undeclared Muslims (30.7%)
3. Croats (23.9%)
4. Others (1.04%)

The 1948 population census in Bosnia and Herzegovina was the seventh census of the population of Bosnia and Herzegovina. The Socialist Federal Republic of Yugoslavia conducted a population census on 15 March 1948. On the territory of Socialist Republic of Bosnia and Herzegovina 2,565,277 persons lived.

== Overall ==
Nationality	Size	Percent
Serbs	1,136,116	44.29%
Ethnically undeclared Muslims	788,403	30.73%
Croats	614,123	23.94%
Others	26,635	1.04%
